Ronald A. Rogerson (June 27, 1943 – August 8, 1987) was an American football coach.  He was the head coach of the Maine Black Bears football team from 1981 to 1984 and the Princeton Tigers football team from 1985 to 1986. He compiled a 26–36–1 overall record.

Rogerson played offensive tackle at Maine, where he won the Harold Westerman Award as outstanding football player in 1964, and graduated in 1966. He began his coaching career in 1967, serving as an assistant line coach at Colorado State University while also earning a master's degree in education. He moved on to Lebanon Valley College as coach of both the offensive and defensive lines. He was also intramural director at Lebanon Valley.

At the University of Delaware Rogerson spent 10 years as an assistant, coaching offensive and defensive lines as well as defensive backs. As Maine's head coach, he was named Yankee Conference Coach of the Year in 1982 after his team shared the league title.

Rogerson died August 8, 1987, of an apparent heart attack while jogging in Wolfeboro, New Hampshire, where he was vacationing with his family. He was 44 and about to begin his third season as head coach at Princeton.

Head coaching record

References

1943 births
1987 deaths
Coaches of American football from New Hampshire
Players of American football from New Hampshire
Colorado State Rams football coaches
Colorado State University alumni
Delaware Fightin' Blue Hens football coaches
Lebanon Valley Flying Dutchmen football coaches
Maine Black Bears football coaches
Maine Black Bears football players
Princeton Tigers football coaches
People from Brewer, Maine